Hege Peikli (born 23 April 1957) is a Norwegian cross-country skier. She was born in Oslo, and represented the club Lambertseter IL. She competed at the 1980 Winter Olympics in Lake Placid, where she placed 37th in the 10 km.

Cross-country skiing results

Olympic Games

References

External links

1957 births
Living people
Skiers from Oslo
Norwegian female cross-country skiers
Olympic cross-country skiers of Norway
Cross-country skiers at the 1980 Winter Olympics